USS Melucta (AK-131) was a , converted from a Liberty Ship, commissioned by the US Navy for service in World War II. She was first named after Thomas A. McGinley, the president of the Duff-Norton Manufacturing Co., and inventor of an improved high-speed screw jack and lifting machinery. She was renamed and commissioned after Melucta, a star in the constellation Gemini. She was responsible for delivering troops, goods and equipment to locations in the war zone.

Construction
Thomas A. McGinley was laid down on 21 January 1944, under Maritime Commission (MARCOM) contract, MC hull 2470, by the St. Johns River Shipbuilding Company, Jacksonville, Florida; she was sponsored by Mrs. Thomas A. McGinley, the widow of the namesake, and launched 20 March 1944. She was acquired by the US Navy as Melucta  from WSA under bareboat charter 31 March 1944; converted from a freighter by Gibbs Gas Engine Co., Jacksonville; and commissioned 22 July 1944.

Service history
Following shakedown off Norfolk, Virginia, Melucta, was assigned to Naval Transportation Service, 17 August, for cargo carrying duties along the U.S. East Coast into the fall. By 10 November, she was en route to the Marshalls, towing  to Pearl Harbor, before continuing on to Ebon Atoll.
 
The cargo ship operated in the South Pacific Ocean for the next year. Melucta steamed to San Francisco, California, in May 1945, for repairs and reloading, departing the first week of June. In mid October she got underway for the U.S. East Coast via the Panama Canal Zone, arriving Norfolk, Virginia, 28 November.

Decommissioning
Melucta was decommissioned there 13 December, and was delivered to War Shipping Administration 5 days later. Her name reverted to Thomas A. McGinley, and she entered the James River Reserve Fleet, in Lee Hall, Virginia. She was struck from the Navy List 3 January 1946. She was sold for scrapping to Revalorizacion de Materiales, SA, on 24 March 1970, for $106,500. She was withdrawn from the fleet on 20 July 1970.

Military awards and honors 

No battle stars are indicated for Melucta in current Navy accounts. However, her crew was eligible for the following medals:
 American Campaign Medal
 Asiatic-Pacific Campaign Medal
 World War II Victory Medal

References

Bibliography

External links
 

 

Crater-class cargo ships
World War II auxiliary ships of the United States
Ships built in Jacksonville, Florida
1944 ships
James River Reserve Fleet